Derelict may refer to:

Law
 Derelict, property that has been abandoned or deserted
 Derelict (maritime), property which has been abandoned and deserted at sea without any hope of recovery

Arts, entertainment, and media

Music
 "Dead Man's Chest", a song also known as "Derelict" or "Fifteen Men on the Dead Man's Chest"
 "Derelict", a song from the 1996 album Odelay by Beck
 Derelicts, a 2017 album from "Carbon Based Lifeforms"
 "The Derelict", a song from the 2009 album Æther Shanties by Abney Park
 "The Derelict", a song from the 1973 album Penguin by Fleetwood Mac
 "The Derelict (God Forsaken)", a song from the 2009 album We the Fallen by Psyclon Nine
 The Derelicts, a 1970s British R&B band

Other uses in arts, entertainment, and media
 Derelict (film), a 1930 American adventure film directed by Rowland V. Lee
 "Derelict", an alternative name for the fictional sea shanty "Dead Man's Chest", from the novel Treasure Island
 "The Derelict" (LIS episode), a first-season episode of the TV series Lost in Space
 "The Derelict" (short story), a 1912 short story by William Hope Hodgson
 The Derelict, a spaceship of extraterrestrial origin in the film Alien (1979)

Other uses
Icon Derelict, a one-off hot-rod classic vehicle based on the Chrysler Town & Country (1941–1988)

See also
Dereliction of duty (disambiguation)